In celebration of the total solar eclipse of August 11, 1999, the National Bank of Romania (BNR) decided to issue a commemorative two thousand Romanian lei banknote. This was the last solar eclipse of the millennium and was visible across southern Romania. Since it was the last eclipse of the millennium, the denomination was chosen to be 2000 in respect to the upcoming year. These notes were issued as legal tender.

Design 
The banknote was designed by the Romanian artist Nicolae Săftoiu, who is credited with the designs on which all Romanian banknotes printed since the 1989 Revolution are based. In observance of the coming millennium, the obverse of the note displays a rendering of the Solar System viewed from afar, showing all of the planets revolving around the Sun.

The reverse of the note displays a map outline of Romania with the colors schemed to match the colors of the Romanian flag. The map marks the main points where the solar eclipse was visible in a path moving along the map from west to east.

The notes were printed using offset printing, a commonly used printing technique where the inked image is transferred (or "offset") from a plate to a rubber blanket, then finally onto the printing surface.

Main security features 
Security features include:
Transparent window - special in specifically polymer notes. It is an open, clear and plastic window in the note which is hard to counterfeit.
Shadow image (Watermark) - includes the BNR logo. This image can be seen when the banknote is held to the light and is embedded into the plastic note.
See-through registration - optical see-through image on each side of the note to make sure it was not printed using a counterfeit, in which case it would not match and align
Printed thread - a black thread that can be seen when the note is held up to the light.
Transmission hologram - The transparent window includes a transmission hologram depicting the Moon eclipsing the Sun.

Commemorative folder 
In order to generate interest with currency collectors, the BNR also issued special commemorative folders with the banknotes. These were limited to 1 million pieces and each one contained a special, low-numbered banknote with the series001A.

History

References 

Banknotes of Romania
Two-thousand-base-unit banknotes